Twelve Spanish ships of the Spanish Navy have borne the name Castilla, after the region of Castilla:
 Castilla (1628), patache in the Royal Navy of Flanders
 Castilla (1728), corvette, 12 guns
 Castilla (1730), ship of the line, 62 guns, launched in 1729 in Guarnizo, commissioned on 11 January 1730, scrapped in 1736 in Havana
 Castilla (1738), ship of the line, 60 guns, launched in 1737 in Havana, sunk in Veracruz by a storm in 1751
 Castilla (1751), ship of the line, 64 guns, constructed in Guarnizo, sunk on 30 September 1769 by a storm near Veracruz
 Castilla (1780), ship of the line, 58 guns, constructed in Ferrol, prison ship for French in 1808, burned by French in 1810 in Cádiz
 Reino de Castilla, first steam ship in the Spanish Navy, built at Ditchburn & Mare (London) in 1846
 Castilla (1842), ex Moctezuma, constructed at Green & Wigram (London) in 1842, first steamer to cross the Atlantic West–East in 1848
 , Aragon-class unprotected cruiser of the Spanish Navy that fought in the Battle of Manila Bay on 1 May 1898 during the Spanish–American War
 Castilla (TA-21), ex 
 Castilla (L-21), ex 
 , Galicia-class LPD

Spanish Navy ship names